The Silent Storm is a 2014 British romantic drama film written and directed by Corinna McFarlane and starring Andrea Riseborough and Damian Lewis. It is the first non-James Bond film to be produced by Eon Productions, since Call Me Bwana.

Cast
Andrea Riseborough as Aislin
Damian Lewis as Balor
Ross Anderson as Fionn
Kate Dickie as Mrs McKinnon
John Sessions as Mr Smith
Eric Robertson as Mr Stewart

Release
The film premiered at the 2014 London Film Festival and was released in the United Kingdom on 20 May 2016.

Reception
The film has a 28% rating on Rotten Tomatoes.  Anna Smith of Empire awarded the film four stars.  Tara Brady of The Irish Times awarded the film two stars out of five.  Cath Clarke of Time Out also awarded the film two stars out of five.  Trevor Johnston of Radio Times also awarded the film two stars out of five.

References

External links
 
 

British romantic drama films
2014 romantic drama films
2010s English-language films
2010s British films